Oru Modhal Oru Kadhal is a 2014 Indian Tamil-language romantic comedy film written and directed by TG Keerthi Kumar and produced by RR under the banner of Kandan Gearup Entertainment. This film has Vivek Rajgopal who played the role of Karthik and Megha Burman, the lead heroine is a Mumbai based model who has already done ad films for many leading brands.
It is loosely based on the love story of director and his wife.

Plot
Oru Modhal Oru Kadhal is a story of Karthik (Vivek Rajgopal), who falls in love with a girl, and their trouble-filled journey from Chennai to Bangalore to Delhi giving troubles to his friends and family, is portrayed hilariously.

Cast
 Vivek Rajgopal as Karthik
 Megha Burman as Anusha
 Pyramid Natarajan as Karthik's Father
 Meera Krishnan as Karthik's Mother
 Swaminathan as Shrinivasan
 Imman Annachi
 Mamta Prasad as Anusha's Aunt
 Ammu Ramachandran as Karthik's Sister

Soundtrack
The film has seven songs which were composed by K. R. Kawin Siva with lyrics for most songs by Dr. Piraisoodan. The centerpiece of the soundtrack is the Tamil-Hindi song "Punjabi Paartha", sung by Shankar Mahadevan and Sunidhi Chauhan, with lyrics by Aditi K.K.

Reception

Critical response
The Times of India wrote that "The film often has the feel of an amateur effort, its humour is corny, the plot is weak, and the acting by the lead pair is strictly functional". Malini Mannath of The New Indian Express wrote that "Oru Modhal Oru Kadhal is a debutant director's efforts gone awry".

References

External links
 

2014 films